Bhoom is a town with a municipal council in Osmanabad district, Maharashtra, India, and it is the headquarters of Bhoom tahsil. Bhoom municipal corporation is established in 1948. Bhoom is a small town situated in a valley of the Banashankar hill ranges of Sahyadri.  It is situated on the banks of the River Banaganga, which eventually flows into the Bhima. In 1717, Sambhaji II of Kolhapur gave Bhoom as jagir to Shrimant Senakhaskhel Yashwantrao Thorat 
(a chief and military leader of his troops) for his bravery. In 19th century Bhoom was under Nizam territory during the British raj in India. However it was independently ruled by the ' Thorat '  royal family. Shrimant Vijaysinh Amarsinh Thorat is the present head of Bhoom. He was the President of Bhoom Municipal Council from 1991 -2006.

History
At the starting of 17th century Bhoom was under Adilshah's territory. After 17th century it was under the Maratha Empire.
In 1717 Sambhaji II of Kolhapur gave the Bhoom as Jagir to Shrimant Senakhaskhel Yashwantrao Thorat (a Chief and Military leader) for his bravery. He ruled Bhum till 1719. In 1719 he had died in a battle with Balaji Vishwanath near Panhala fort. After his death his ancestors ruled Bhoom till 15 August 1947.

Rulers of Bhoom

Shrimant Senakhaskhel Yashwantrao Thorat (1717-1719) was the founder of this jagir.
Shrimant Senakhaskhel Narayanrao Thorat - Second ruler of Bhoom.
Shrimant Senakhaskhel Dattajirao Thorat - Third ruler of Bhoom.
Shrimant Senakhaskhel Vijaysinh Thorat - Fourth ruler of Bhoom.
Shrimant Senakhaskhel Amarsinh Thorat- Fifth ruler of Bhoom.
 Shrimant Senakhaskhel Vijaysinh Thorat- Current ruler of Bhoom.

Demographics
In the 2001 Indian census, Bhum Tahsil had a population of 116,894, with 60,620 (51.9%) males and 56,274 (48.1%) females, for a gender ratio of 928 females per thousand males.

In the 2011 census, Bhum Tahsil had 137,217 inhabitants and a gender ratio of 905 females per thousand males. The tahsil was 86.4% rural. The literacy rate in 2011 was 73.08% overall in Bhum Tahsil, with a rate of 82.86% for males and 62.45% for females. In 2011 in Bhum Tahsil, 11.5% of the population was 0 to 6 years of age.
In Bhoom City, since 21/07/2000 Hi-Infotech Computer Education Statred Computer Education—till today, there are approximately 10,000 students and employees who have successfully completed the Computer Course.

Bhoom is divided into two areas, Kasba and Peth by the Banganga River. Kasba is the more traditional village type area with most of the people involved in farming. Peth is more cosmopolitan where people of various professions live together. At the end of the 20th century and the beginning of the 21st, Bhoom added more white collar jobs due to the educated peoples and new colonies near the college. Banganga and Ramganga dams provide water for drinking.
 
The residences places of Bhoom includes BIRBALE Galli, veer Sawarkar chowk Gandhi Chowk, Sambhaji Chowk, Maskar-Shendge Galli, Wadar Galli, Bagwan Galli, Nagoba Galli, Koshti Galli, Galib Nagar, Pardhi Pedhi, Ramhari Nagar, Kusum Nagar, Bhim Nagar, Shivaji Nagar and 
Samarth nagar, Farshi Galli, Lakshmi Nagar, Kasba.
In Bhoom City Samarth Nagar is located in central city.
Hi-Infotech Computer Education is started in 21-07-2000. Now 10000 + students successfully education MS-CIT.

References

Cities and towns in Osmanabad district
Talukas in Maharashtra